Baladiyat Al-Mosul Sport Club or Mosul Municipality Social & Sport Club, is an Iraqi football team based in Mosul, Nineveh, that plays in Iraq Division Two.

Managerial history
 Salwan Mohammed
 Nashwan Ahmed Yassin
 Muwafaq Mahmoud 
 Ziyad Mahmoud

See also 
 2020–21 Iraq FA Cup
 2021–22 Iraq FA Cup

References

External links
 Baladiyat Al-Mosul SC on Goalzz.com
 Iraq Clubs- Foundation Dates

2013 establishments in Iraq
Association football clubs established in 2013
Football clubs in Nineveh